The 1894 Colorado Silver and Gold football team was an American football team that represented the University of Colorado as a member of the Colorado Football Association (CFA) during the 1894 college football season. Led by Harry Heller in his first and only season as head coach, Colorado compiled an overall record of 8–1 with a mark of 5–0 in conference play, winning the CFA title. The season marked the program's first conference championship and first head coach.

Schedule

References

Colorado
Colorado Buffaloes football seasons
Colorado Football Association football champion seasons
Colorado Silver and Gold football